Francis Hastings may refer to:

 Francis Hastings (died 1595) (1560–1595), MP for Leicestershire
 Francis Hastings, 2nd Earl of Huntingdon (1514–1561), son of Henry VIII's mistress, Anne Stafford
 Sir Francis Hastings (died 1610) (c. 1545–1610), his son, Member of Parliament for Leicestershire and Somerset
 Francis Hastings Doyle (1810–1888), British poet
 Francis Hastings of Madras (died 1721), British president of Madras
 Francis Hastings, 10th Earl of Huntingdon (1729–1789), British peer
 Francis Hastings, 16th Earl of Huntingdon (1901–1990), British artist, academic and Labour politician
 Francis Hastings, Lord Hastings (1560–1595), son of the 4th Earl of Huntingdon

See also
 Francis Rawdon-Hastings, 1st Marquess of Hastings (1754–1826), Anglo-Irish British politician and military officer
 Frank Hastings, fictional detective